The 1990 SunBank 24 at Daytona was a 24-hour endurance sports car race held on February 3–4, 1990 at the Daytona International Speedway road course. The race served as the opening round of the 1990 IMSA GT Championship. 

Victory overall and in the GTP class went to the No. 61 Castrol Jaguar Racing Jaguar XJR-12 driven by Davy Jones, Jan Lammers, and Andy Wallace. Victory in the GTP Lights class went to the No. 36 Erie Scientific Racing Argo JM16 driven by John Grooms, Michael Greenfield, and Frank Jellinek. The GTO class was won by the No. 15 Tru-Cur/Roush Racing Mercury Cougar XR-7 driven by Robby Gordon, Calvin Fish, and Lyn St. James. Finally, the GTU class was won by the No. 71 Peter Uria Racing Mazda RX-7 driven by Peter Uria, Bob Dotson, Jim Pace, and Rusty Scott.

Race results
Class winners in bold.

References

External links
RacinSportsCars.com
MotorsportMagazine.com
IMSA.com

24 Hours of Daytona
1990 in sports in Florida
1990 in American motorsport